Mixian is a type of rice noodle from the Yunnan Province, China. It is made from ordinary non-glutinous rice, and it is generally sold fresh rather than dried.

Production
The processing of mixian in Yunnan is unique, involving a fermentation process.

Serving

Mixian is served in various ways, either in broth or stir-fried.

Stir-fried
Stir-fried preparation is rapid, most common in the evening, and is popular at roadside barbecue-type stands throughout Yunnan. Egg, tomato, meat, spring onion and chilli are frequently utilized.

Broth
The most famous prepared dish is guoqiao mixian (literally 'crossing the bridge noodles').

More normally, when mixian is served in broth in Yunnanese restaurants, it is an extremely popular breakfast and day-time dish. Broths are generally chicken or beef, though others exist.

It is common for a range of individual condiments to be presented for the customer to add to their bowl themselves. Usually the noodles are first added to the broth (see copper pot image), but sometimes the customer is presented the noodles in a separate bowl (see condiment image). In this latter case, condiments are generally added directly to the broth prior to adding the noodles.

Meat is generally added to the broth and may be in the form of larger, chunkier pieces (even including bone) or thin-sliced fillets.

Condiments vary significantly but may typically include some subset of the following:
 chicken powder or essence
 chili pepper (diced fresh chili, plus at least one or two prepared chilli pastes, often mixed with oil)
 chrysanthemum flowers
 coriander
 mint
 garlic (often finely diced, in liquid suspension, or in thin sectioned slices)
 ginger (as above, but less commonly in slices)
 pepper (both regular pepper and powdered or whole Sichuan pepper)
 salt
 sesame oil
 Sichuan pepper oil
 soy sauce
 spring onion
 suan cai (pickled or preserved vegetable)
 tomato
 vinegar
 wood ear mushroom
 zhe'ergen (a spicy root common to southwestern China).

The creation of a rich, personal broth is a quintessential part of the mixian experience.

Geographical extent
Mixian is popular in Yunnan Province, where it can be found in many streets and villages, and is occasionally available in other mainland Chinese cities. It is generally very difficult to obtain outside of mainland China, probably since the fresh method of preparation could be seen to necessitate a certain minimum volume of consumption in order to be commercially viable. It is relatively similar to noodles consumed in neighbouring Laos (feu) and Vietnam (phở), with the key difference that the base mixian broth is usually heavily personalized by the customer in Yunnanese tradition, and the establishment's own pre-made broth is less adulterated and more significantly appreciated/judged as a key factor in Vietnam (and perhaps to a lesser extent Laos). Dishes like nan gyi thohk and baik kut kyee kaik in various parts of Myanmar are based on a similar dimension of rice noodle but differ broadly in flavour profile (tending more toward flavours in Indian cuisine with ingredients such as chickpea flour) and preparatory method (far greater use of frying). It is more common in unadulterated Yunnanese form in commercial centers of Myanmar with growing Chinese populations, such as Mandalay. Dishes in Thailand such as pad thai also rely on rice noodles, though often they are flat and therefore more similar to Chinese juanfen or Yunnanese migan. A Tibetan broth-based noodle dish using wheat-flour instead of rice-flour noodles, thukpa, is thought to have originated in eastern Tibet (i.e. closer to Yunnan) and is made and enjoyed throughout Bhutan, Northeast India, Nepal, Sikkim and Tibet.

See also
Migan (noodle)
Rice, History of domestication and cultivation
Yunnan cuisine
Khanom chin, a Thai fermented-rice noodle

References

Yunnan cuisine
Chinese noodles
Rice dishes
Fermented foods